Ernits is a surname of Estonian origin.

People with this name include:
 Heiki Ernits (born 1953) is an Estonian animator, illustrator, and film director.
 Peeter Ernits (born 1953) is an Estonian zoologist, journalist and politician. He has been member of XIII and XIV Riigikogu.
 Villem Ernits (1891–1982) was an Estonian politician.

References

Estonian-language surnames